Sergius I may refer to:

 Sergius of Tella, Patriarch of the Syriac Orthodox Church in 544–546
 Sergius I of Constantinople (died in 638)
 Pope Sergius I (died in 701), Sicilian-born pope
 Sergius I of Naples (died 864)
 Sergius I of Amalfi (died 966)
 Patriarch Sergius I of Moscow (1867–1944)

See also 
 Sergius